Felipe Dias da Silva or simply Felipe Dias (born January 11, 1986 in São Paulo), is a Brazilian right back.

Honours
Brazilian Cup: 2006

External links
 Guardian Stats Centre
Flapedia Profile
 CBF

1986 births
Living people
Footballers from São Paulo
Brazilian footballers
Clube Atlético Juventus players
CR Flamengo footballers
Clube Náutico Capibaribe players
Associação Desportiva Cabofriense players
Ferroviário Atlético Clube (CE) players
Association football defenders